The first world record in the women's 400 metres hurdles was recognised by the International Association of Athletics Federations (IAAF) in 1974. The current record is 50.68 seconds, set by American Sydney McLaughlin on July 22, 2022 at the 2022 World Athletics Championships in Eugene, Oregon.

The first documented 400 m hurdles race for women took place in 1971 but the event was officially introduced as a discipline in 1974.

Progression

See also
 Men's 400 metres hurdles world record progression
 Hurdling

References

External links
 400 Metres Hurdles All Time List from the IAAF

400 m hurdles, women
World record